Prince Alexander Andreyevich Bezborodko (6 April 1799) was the Grand Chancellor of Russian Empire and chief architect of Catherine the Great's foreign policy after the death of Nikita Panin.

Early life
His father Andrey Bezborodko was a general scribe (chancellor), while his mother Eudokia was a daughter of general judge Mikhail Zabila.

He was educated at home and in the Kyiv-Mohyla Academy. Upon finishing his education, he entered the public service as a clerk in the office of Count P. A. Rumyantsev, then Governor-general of Little Russia, whom he accompanied to the Turkish War in 1768. He was present at the engagements of Larga and Kagul, and at the storming of Silistria.

On the conclusion of the Treaty of Küçük Kaynarca (1774) the field marshal recommended him to Catherine II, and she appointed him in 1775 her petition-secretary. He thus had the opportunity of impressing the empress with his brilliant gifts, the most remarkable of which were exquisite manners, a marvellous memory and a clear and pregnant style. At the same time he set to work to acquire the principal European languages, especially French, of which he became a master. 
It was at this time that he wrote his historical sketches of the Tatar wars and of Ukraine.

His activity was prodigious, and Catherine called him her factotum. In 1780 he accompanied her on her journey through Novorossiya, meeting the emperor Joseph II, who urged him to study diplomacy. On his return from a delicate mission to Copenhagen, he presented to the empress "a memorial on political affairs" which comprised the first plan of a partition of Turkey between Russia and Austria. This document was transmitted almost word for word to Vienna as the Russian proposals. He followed this up by Epitomised Historical Information concerning Moldavia. For these two state papers he was rewarded with the posts of "plenipotentiary for all negotiations " in the foreign office and postmaster-general.

Career under Catherine II
From this time he was inseparably associated with Catherine in all important diplomatic affairs, though officially he was the subordinate of the vice-chancellor, Count Ivan Osterman. He wrote all the most important despatches to the Russian ministers abroad, concluded and subscribed all treaties, and performed all the functions of a secretary of state. He identified himself entirely with Catherine's political ideas, even with that of re-establishing the Greek empire under her grandson Constantine. The empress, as usual, richly rewarded her comes with pensions and principalities. In 1786 he was promoted to the Governing Senate, and it was through him that the empress communicated her will to that august state-decoration. In 1787 he accompanied Catherine on her triumphal progress through South Russia in the capacity of minister of foreign affairs. At Kanev he conducted the negotiations with the Polish king, Stanislaus II, and at Novaya Kaidaniya he was in the empress's carriage when she received Joseph II.

The second Turkish War (1787-92) and the Swedish war with Gustavus III (1788–90) heaped fresh burdens on his already heavily laden shoulders, and he suffered from the intrigues of his numerous jealous rivals, including the empress's latest favorite, A. M. Mamonov. All his efforts were directed towards the conclusion of the two oppressive wars by an honorable peace. The pause of Verela with Gustavus III (14 August 1790) was on the terms dictated by him. On the sudden death of Potemkin he was despatched to Jassy to prevent the peace congress there from breaking up, and succeeded, in the face of all but insuperable difficulties, in concluding a treaty exceedingly advantageous to Russia (9 January 1792). For this service he received the thanks of the empress, the ribbon of St Andrew and 50,000 roubles.

On his return from Jassy, however, he found his confidential post of secretary of petitions occupied by the empress's last favorite, Prince Zubov. He complained of this "diminution of his dignity" to the empress in a private memorial in the course of 1793. The empress reassured him by fresh honors and distinctions on the occasion of the solemn celebration of the peace of Jassy (2 September 1793), when she publicly presented him with a golden olive-branch encrusted with brilliants. Subsequently, Catherine reconciled him with Zubov, and he resumed the conduct of foreign affairs. He contributed more than any other man to bring about the downfall and the third partition of Poland, for which he was magnificently recompensed.

Grand Chancellor of the Russian Empire
But diplomacy by no means exhausted Bezborodko's capacity for work. He had a large share in the internal administration also. He reformed the post-office, improved the banking system of Russia, regulated the finances, constructed roads, and united the Uniate and Orthodox churches. On the death of Catherine, Emperor Paul entrusted Bezborodko with the examination of the late empress's private papers, and shortly afterwards made him a prince of the Russian Empire, with a correspondingly splendid apanage. On the retirement of Osterman he received the highest dignity in the Russian Empire – that of imperial chancellor.

Bezborodko was the only Russian minister who retained the favor of Paul to the last. During the last two years of his life, control of Russia's diplomacy was entirely in his hands. His programme at this period was peace with all the European powers, revolutionary France included. But the emperor's growing aversion to this pacific policy induced the astute old minister to attempt to "seek safety in moral and physical repose." Paul, however, refused to accept his resignation and would have sent him abroad for the benefit of his health, had not a sudden stroke of paralysis prevented Bezborodko from taking advantage of his master's kindness. 
He died at St Petersburg on 6 April 1799.

Personal qualities
In private life, Bezborodko was a typical Catherinian, corrupt, licentious, conscienceless and self-seeking. But he was infinitely generous and affectionate, and spent his enormous fortune liberally. His banquets were magnificent, his collections of pictures and statues unique in Europe. He was the best friend of his innumerable poor relatives, and the Maecenas of all the struggling authors of his day. Sycophantic he might have been, but he was neither ungrateful nor vindictive. His patriotism is as indisputable as his genius.

Residences

Bezborodko Palace in Saint Petersburg

The Bezborodko Palace is located at Почтамтский переулок 4 (Pochtamskaya pereulok 4, Post-Office Lane 4) in 190000 Saint Petersburg.
The palace was built in 1783–95 to a design by Giacomo Quarenghi. There emerged a palace designed according to the principles of Russian Classicism.  While the façade of the mansion looked fairly modest, its interiors were notable for their resplendence. The interior decoration has partly survived till today. The façade however has changed much since its erection. Only a portico of four granite columns survived from the original façade. After the count's death his heirs sold the palace to the Post-Office Department that adapted the building to its needs. In 1924 the building was given into the possession of the Museum of communications. During the siege it suffered badly from artillery bombardments and was closed for repair. The museum partly resumed its display only in 1950. In 1974 owing to a drastic state of the entire structure its major repair was started and the museum has returned to the building only thirty years later, in 2003.

Bezborodko Dacha in Saint Petersburg

The dacha is located at Свердловская набережная 40 (Sverdlovskaya naberezhnaya 40, Sverdlovsk Embankment 40) in 195027 Saint Petersburg.
The dacha was built in 1783–84 to a design by Giacomo Quarenghi. It's a central three-storey building with round turrets in the corners, joined with arched galleries to two symmetrical side wings. In the first half of the 19th century the side wings were linked by a chain railing held in the mouths of twenty-nine cast-iron lions. There used to be a large landscape park with pavilions.

References

External links

Bezborodko's dacha in St Petersburg

1747 births
1799 deaths
Members of the Russian Academy
People from Hlukhiv
Russian princes
Ukrainian people in the Russian Empire
Foreign ministers of the Russian Empire
Chancellors of the Russian Empire
National University of Kyiv-Mohyla Academy alumni
18th-century diplomats of the Russian Empire
Zabila family
Burials at the Annunciation Church of the Alexander Nevsky Lavra